Clare Sambrook is an English-Irish freelance journalist and author. Sambrook is best known for her work concerning the End Child Detention Now campaign which won her the Paul Foot Award and the Bevins Prize.

Education and career

In high school, Sambrook won the Vellacott History Prize from the University of Cambridge. She later studied at Cambridge.

After university Sambrook began working for the John Lewis Gazette before working for the Haymarket Group. She later began working at the newspaper, The Daily Telegraph before leaving to become a freelance journalist so that she could concentrate on investigations.

Canongate published Sambrook's first novel, Hide and Seek in the UK in 2005. The book is written from the point of view of a 9-year-old boy called Harry who had to deal with the aftermath of the abduction of his 5-year-old brother, Daniel.

In 2010, Sambrook won the Paul Foot Award and the Bevins Prize for her articles which exposed government policies concerning the arrest and detention of asylum-seeking families and for her work with the End Child Detention Now campaign which she co-founded.

She was nominated for the Orwell Prize in 2013 and 2015.

References

British women journalists
Living people
Year of birth missing (living people)
British journalists
Alumni of the University of Cambridge